Rafel Aveleyra (born 29 July 1932) is a Mexican archer. He competed in the men's individual event at the 1972 Summer Olympics.

References

1932 births
Living people
Mexican male archers
Olympic archers of Mexico
Archers at the 1972 Summer Olympics
Place of birth missing (living people)
20th-century Mexican people